The Royal Canadian Navy expanded rapidly and substantially during the Second World War, with vessels transferred or purchased from the Royal Navy and US Navy, and the construction of many vessels in Canada, such as corvettes and frigates. The RCN ended the war with the third-largest naval fleet in the world, and an operational reach extending into the Atlantic, Pacific, Caribbean and Mediterranean. The List of Royal Canadian Navy ships of the Second World War lists over 1,140 surface warships, submarines and auxiliary vessels in service during the war. It includes all commissioned, non-commissioned, loaned or hired ships, and all ships crewed by RCN personnel, including 30 depot ships (or "stone frigates"), under the command of the RCN.

Surface vessels

Escort carriers


 (Ruler class)

Light cruisers

 (later renamed )


Armed merchant cruisers 


 (Prince class)
 (Prince class)

Destroyers


 (A class)
 (C class)
 (C class)
 (C class)
 (C class)
 (C class)
 (Cr class)
 (Cr class)
 (D class)
 (D class)
 (E class)
 (F class)
 (F class)
 (G class)
 (H class)
()
 (Wickes class)
 (Wickes class)
 (Wickes class)
 
 (Clemson class)
 (Clemson class)

 (Tribal class)
 (Tribal class)
 (Tribal class)
  (Tribal class)
 (Tribal class)
 (Tribal class)
 (Tribal class)
 (V class)
 (V class)
*
 (Town class)*
 (Town class)*
 (Town class)*
 (Town class)*
 (Town class)*
 (Town class)*
 (Town class)*
 (Town class)*
 (Town class)*

*(US Navy Wickes and Clemson-class vessels commissioned into the Royal Navy as Town class, and later loaned to the RCN. Some also commissioned into the RCN.)

Frigates


 (River class)
 (River class)
 (River class)
 (River class)
 (River class)
 (River class)
 (River class)
 (K244) (River class)
 (River class)
 (River class)
 (River class)
 (River class)
 (River class)
 (River class)
 (River class)
 (River class)
 (River class)
 (River class)
 (River class)
 (River class)
 (River class)
 (River class)
 (River class)
 (River class)
 (River class)
  (River class)
 (River class)
 (River class)
 (River class)
 (River class)
 (River class)
 (River class)
 (River class)
 (River class)
 (River class)
 (River class)
 (River class)
 (River class)
 (River class)
 (River class)
 (River class)
 (River class)
 (River class)
 (River class)
 (River class)
 (River class, originally Megantic)
 (River class)
 (River class)
 (River class)
 (River class)
 (River class)
 (River class)
 (River class)
 (River class)
 (River class)
 (River class)
 (River class)
 (River class)
 (River class)
 (River class)
 (River class)
 (River class)
 (River class)
 (River class)
 (River class)

 (Loch class)
 (Loch class)

Corvettes


 (Flower class)
 (Flower class)
 (Flower class)
 (Flower class)
 (Flower class)
 (Flower class)
 (Flower class)
 (Flower class)
 (Flower class)
 (Flower class)
 (Flower class)
 (Flower class)
 (Flower class)
 (Flower class)
 (Flower class)
 (Flower class)
 (Flower class)
 (Flower class)
 (Flower class)
 (K244) (Flower class)
 (Flower class)
 (Flower class)
 (Flower class)
 (Flower class)
 (Flower class)
 (Flower class)
 (Flower class)
 (Flower class)
 (Flower class)
 (Flower class)
 (Flower class)
 (Flower class)
 (Flower class)
 (Flower class)
 (Flower class)
 (Flower class)
 (Flower class)
 (Flower class)
 (Flower class)
 (Flower class)
 (Flower class)
 (Flower class)
 (Flower class)
 (Flower class)
 (Flower class)
 (Flower class)
 (Flower class)
 (Flower class)
 (Flower class)
 (Flower class)
 (Flower class)
 (Flower class)
 (Flower class)
 (Flower class)
 (Flower class)
 (Flower class)
 (Flower class)
 (Flower class)
 (Flower class)
 (Flower class)
 (Flower class)
 (Flower class)
 (Flower class)
 (Flower class)
 (Flower class)
 (Flower class)
 (Flower class)
 (Flower class)
 (Flower class)
 (Flower class)
 (Flower class)
 (Flower class)
 (Flower class)
 (Flower class)
 (Flower class)
 (Flower class)
 (Flower class)
 (Flower class)
 (Flower class)
 (Flower class)
 (Flower class)
 (Flower class)
 (Flower class)
 (Flower class)
 (Flower class)
 (Flower class)
 (Flower class)
 (Flower class)
 (Flower class)
 (Flower class)
 (Flower class)
 (Flower class)
 (Flower class)
 (Flower class)
 (Flower class)
 (Flower class)
 (Flower class)
 (Flower class)
 (Flower class)
 (Flower class)
 (Flower class)
 (Flower class)
 (Flower class)
 (Flower class)
 (Flower class)
 (Flower class)
 (Flower class)
 (Flower class)
 (Flower class)
 (Flower class)

 (Castle class)
 (Castle class)
 (Castle class)
 (Castle class)
 (Castle class)
 (Castle class)
 (Castle class)
 (Castle class)
 (Castle class)
 (Castle class)
 (Castle class)

Minesweepers


 (Algerine class)
 (Algerine class)
 (Algerine class)
 (Algerine class)
 (Algerine class)
 (Algerine class)
 (Algerine class)
 (Algerine class)
 (Algerine class)
 (Algerine class)
 (Algerine class)

 (Bangor class)
 (Bangor class)
 (Bangor class)
 (Bangor class)
 (Bangor class)
 (Bangor class)
 (Bangor class)
 (Bangor class)
 (Bangor class)
 (Bangor class)
 (Bangor class)
 (Bangor class)
 (Bangor class)
 (Bangor class)
 (Bangor class)
 (Bangor class)
 (Bangor class)
 (Bangor class)
 (Bangor class)
 (Bangor class)
 (Bangor class)
 (Bangor class)
 (Bangor class)
 (Bangor class)
 (Bangor class)
 (Bangor class)
 (Bangor class)
 (Bangor class)
 (Bangor class)
 (Bangor class)
 (Bangor class)
 (Bangor class)
 (Bangor class)
 (Bangor class)
 (Bangor class)
 (Bangor class)
 (Bangor class)
 (Bangor class)
 (Bangor class)
 (Bangor class)
 (Bangor class)
 (Bangor class)
 (Bangor class)
 (Bangor class)
 (Bangor class)
 (Bangor class)
 (Bangor class)
 (Bangor class)
 (Bangor class)
 (Bangor class)
 (Bangor class)
 (Bangor class)
 (Bangor class)

 (Fundy class)
 (Fundy class)
 (Fundy class)

 (Lake class)
 (Lake class)
 (Lake class)
 (Lake class)
 (Lake class)
 (Lake class)
 (Lake class)
 (Lake class)
 (Lake class)
 (Lake class)
 (Lake class)
 (Lake class)
 (Lake class)
 (Lake class)

 (Llewellyn class)
 (Llewellyn class)
 (Llewellyn class)
 (Llewellyn class)
 (Llewellyn class)
 (Llewellyn class)
 (Llewellyn class)
 (Llewellyn class)
 (Llewellyn class)

Motor launches

 (Fairmile B Type A) 

 (loaned to FFN)

 
 
HMC ML Q056
HMC ML Q057
HMC ML Q058
HMC ML Q059
HMC ML Q060
HMC ML Q061
HMC ML Q062 (loaned to FFN)
HMC ML Q063 (loaned to FFN)
HMC ML Q064
HMC ML Q065
HMC ML Q066
HMC ML Q067
HMC ML Q068
HMC ML Q069
HMC ML Q070
HMC ML Q071
HMC ML Q072
HMC ML Q073
HMC ML Q074
HMC ML Q075
HMC ML Q076
HMC ML Q077
HMC ML Q078
HMC ML Q079
HMC ML Q080
HMC ML Q081
HMC ML Q082
HMC ML Q083
HMC ML Q084
HMC ML Q085
HMC ML Q086
HMC ML Q087
HMC ML Q088
HMC ML Q089
HMC ML Q090
HMC ML Q091
HMC ML Q092
HMC ML Q093
HMC ML Q094
HMC ML Q095
HMC ML Q096
HMC ML Q097
HMC ML Q098
HMC ML Q099
HMC ML Q100
HMC ML Q101
HMC ML Q102
HMC ML Q103
HMC ML Q104
HMC ML Q105
HMC ML Q106
HMC ML Q107
HMC ML Q108
HMC ML Q109
HMC ML Q110
HMC ML Q111
HMC ML Q112  (Fairmile B Type B)
HMC ML Q113 
HMC ML Q114 
HMC ML Q115 
HMC ML Q116 
HMC ML Q117 
HMC ML Q118 
HMC ML Q119 
HMC ML Q120 
HMC ML Q121 
HMC ML Q122 
HMC ML Q124 
HMC ML Q125 
HMC ML Q126 
HMC ML Q127 
HMC ML Q128 
HMC ML Q129

*(Canadian Fairmiles were not commissioned. They were not named, until sold off, or assigned as tenders to various bases post-war. Ships loaned to Free French Navy (FFN) served under Canadian command.)

Motor Torpedo Boats 

HMCS CMTB-1
"S-03" (ex USN PT-3)
"S-04" (ex USN PT-4)
"S-05" (ex USN PT-5)
"S-06" (ex USN PT-6)
"S-07" (ex USN PT-7)
HMCS S-09 (ex USN PT-9)
MTB 459 (G type)
MTB 460 (G type)
MTB 461 (G type)
MTB 462 (G type)
MTB 463 (G type)
MTB 464 (G type)
MTB 465 (G type)
MTB 466 (G type)
MTB 485 (G type)
MTB 486 (G type)
MTB 491 (G type)
MTB 726 (Fairmile D type)
MTB 727 (Fairmile D type)
MTB 735 (Fairmile D type) 
MTB 736 (Fairmile D type)
MTB 737 (Fairmile D type)
MTB 743 (Fairmile D type)
MTB 744 (Fairmile D type)
MTB 745 (Fairmile D type)
MTB 746 (Fairmile D type)
MTB 747 (Fairmile D type)
MTB 748 (Fairmile D type) 
MTB 797 (Fairmile D type)

Armed trawlers


 (Isles class)
 (Isles class)
 (Isles class)
 (Isles class)
 (Isles class)
 (Isles class)
 (Isles class)

Armed yachts

 (Q11/Z32)
 (S10/Z10) (ex-Aztec)
 (ex-Elfreda)
HMCS Culver
 (ex-USS Sabalo)
 (ex-Arcadia)

 (S14), (ex-Halonia)
 (ex-Mascotte)
 (ex-Winchester (II))

Landing craft 

LCI (L) 115
LCI (L) 117
LCI (L) 118
LCI (L) 121
LCI (L) 125
LCI (L) 135
LCI (L) 166
LCI (L) 177
LCI (L) 249
LCI (L) 250
LCI (L) 252
LCI (L) 255
LCI (L) 260
LCI (L) 262
LCI (L) 263
LCI (L) 264
LCI (L) 266 
LCI (L) 270
LCI (L) 271
LCI (L) 276
LCI (L) 277
LCI (L) 285
LCI (L) 288
LCI (L) 295
LCI (L) 298
LCI (L) 299
LCI (L) 301
LCI (L) 302
LCI (L) 305
LCI (L) 306
LCI (L) 310
LCI (L) 311
LCA 736
LCA 850
LCA 856
LCA 925
LCA 1021
LCA 1033
LCA 1057
LCA 1059
LCA 1137
LCA 1138
LCA 1150
LCA 1151
LCA 1371
LCA 1372
LCA 1374
LCA 1375

Submarines

 (surrendered and recommissioned U-boat)
 (surrendered and recommissioned U-boat)

Auxiliaries
(The symbol FY in the pennant number denotes fishing vessels of the Fisherman's Reserve which constituted a large portion of the auxiliary fleet throughout the Second World War.)

Accommodation vessels

 II
 HMCS Venture II

Anti-submarine target towing vessels

 CNAV Atwood (Z 47)
 CNAV Brentwood (Z 48)
 CNAV Eastwood (Z 49)
 CNAV Greenwood (Z 50)
CNAV  Inglewood (Z 51)
CNAV  Kirkwood (Z 53)
 CNAV Lakewood (Z 63)
CNAV  Oakwood (Z 64)
CNAV  Wildwood (Z 65)

How many total?

Cable layers

HMCS Cyrus Field

Coil skids

C.S. 8
C.S. 10
C.S. 13
C.S. 14
C.S. 15
C.S. 16
C.S. 17
C.S. 18

Diving vessels

Diving Tender No 2
Diving Tender No 3
Diving Tender No 4
Diving Tender No 5
Diving Tender No 6

Examination vessels

 (Z03/W03)

HMCS Citadelle
HMCS French (S01/Z23) 
 (Z31/J16)
HMCS Laurier (S09/Z34) 
 (W07/Z38)
 (Z44)
 (Fy 93/Z02/Z24) 
 (Z19/J19)
 (Z39)
HMCS Ulna
HMCS Zoarces (Fy 62/Z36)

Gate vessels

GV 1 (ex-)
GV 2
GV 3
GV 4
GV 5
GV 6
GV 7
GV 8
GV 9
GV 10
GV 11
GV 12 (ex-)
GV 13
GV 14 (ex-)
GV 15 (ex-)
GV 16 (ex-)
GV 17 (|ex-)
GV 18
GV 19
GV 20 (ex-CD 101)
GV 21
GV 22
GV 23
GV 24

Harbour craft 

 HC 1 (Gay Rover)
 HC 2
 HC 3
 HC 4
 HC 5
 HC 6
 HC 7
 HC 8
 HC 9
 HC 10
 HC 11
 HC 12
 HC 13
 HC 14
 HC 15
 HC 16
 HC 17
 HC 18
 HC 19
 HC 20
 HC 21
 HC 22
 HC 23
 HC 24
 HC 25
 HC 26 (ex-Active II)
 HC 27 (ex-Advance)
 HC 28 (ex-Aqcharaz)
 HC 29 (ex-Arrow)
 HC 30 (ex-Alberta III)
 HC 31 (ex-Zig Zag, ex-)
 HC 32 (ex-Rustic I)
 HC 33 (ex-)
 HC 34 (ex-)
 HC 35
 HC 36 (ex-)
 HC 37 (ex- I)
 HC 38 (ex-)
 HC 39 (ex-Clair L)
 HC 40 (I) (ex-Doris May)
 HC 40 (II) (ex-)
 HC 41 (ex-Edith 1)
 HC 42 (Ednorina)
 HC 43 (ex-Ellsworth)
 HC 44 (ex-Emoh)
 HC 45 (ex-Nancy Lee)
 HC 46 (ex-Fernand Rinfret)
 HC 47 (ex-Guardian)
 HC 48 (ex-Gulf Ranger I)
 HC 49 (ex- II)
 HC 50  (ex-Invader)
 HC 51 (ex-Islander)
 HC 52 (ex-Jack L. Ingalls)
 HC 53 (ex-) 
 HC 54
 HC 55 (ex-Jessie May)
 HC 56 (Langholm)
 HC 57
 HC 58 (ex-Lila G)
 HC 59 (ex-Lorraine)
 HC 60 (ex-Marlis)
 HC 61 (ex-Marmat)
 HC 62 (ex-Matapan)
 HC 63 (ex-) 
 HC 64 (ex-Raficer) 
 HC 65 (ex-Saker II) 
 HC 66
 HC 67 (ex-Marie Therese) 
 HC 68
 HC 69  (ex-Wild Duck I) 
 HC 70 (ex-"ML 007")
 HC 71
 HC 72
 HC 73 (ex-"ML 010")
 HC 74
 HC 75  (ex-"ML 013", ex-))
 HC 76
 HC 77
 HC 78 (ex-Miss Gray)
 HC 79 (ex-Miss Kelvin)
 HC 80 (ex-Moby Dick I)
 HC 82
 HC 83
 HC 84
 HC 85 (ex-Nancy C)
 HC 86 (ex-Nepsya)
 HC 87 (ex-New America)
 HC 88 (Newbrunswicker)
 HC 89 (ex-Laval)
 HC 90 (ex-Papoose)
 HC 91
 HC 92 (ex-Rio Casma)
 HC 93 (ex-R.J. Foote)
 HC 94 (ex-Rosemary)
 HC 95 (ex-Saltpetre)
 HC 96 (ex-Saravan)
 HC 97 (ex-Shirley Mae)
 HC 98 (ex-Soma I)
 HC 99 (ex-Spartan III)
 HC 100 (ex-Sidney River)
 HC 101 (ex-Tantramar)
 HC 102 (ex-)
 HC 103 (ex-Valinda)
 HC 104 (ex-)
 HC 105 (ex-Wild Duck II)
 HC 106 (ex-Wings)
 HC 107 (ex-Workboy)
 HC 108
 HC 109
 HC 110 (ex-Queen Bee I)
 HC 113
 HC 115
 HC 116
 HC 117
 HC 118
 HC 119
 HC 120
 HC 122
 HC 121 (ex-Lady Beth II)
 HC 123 (ex-Tao Tog)
 HC 124 (ex-Yorkholme)
 HC 125 (Universe Z125)
 HC 126
 HC 127 (ex-Skimmer II)
 HC 128 (ex-Bytown
 HC 129 (ex-Susan S)
 HC 130 (ex-Fahe)
 HC 131
 HC 132
 HC 133 (ex-Montcalm)
 HC 134 (ex-Fortuna)
 HC 135 (Veraine)
 HC 136 (ex-Ditchburn)
 HC 137 (ex-Venning)
 HC 138 (ex-Viking)
 HC 139 (ex-Rainbow II)
 HC 140 
 HC 141 
 HC 142 (ex-HMCS Blarney II)
 HC 143 (ex-HMCS Gertrude)
 HC 144 (ex-HMCS Hornet)
 HC 145 (ex-HMCS Uno)
 HC 146
 HC 147 (ex-Dorcas II)
 HC 148
 HC 149
 HC 151
 HC 152
 HC 153
 HC 154
 HC 155
 HC 156
 HC 157 (ex-HC 81)
 HC 158 (ex-Dolphin II III)
 HC 159 (ex-Mush)
 HC 160 (ex-Mary Goreham)
 HC 161
 HC 162
 HC 163
 HC 164
 HC 165 (ex-Pal-O-Mine II)
 HC 166
 HC 167
 HC 168
 HC 169 
 HC 170 (ex-Mush)
 HC 171 (ex-Skimmer III)
 HC 173
 HC 175
 HC 176
 HC 177
 HC 178
 HC 180 (ex-RCMP D-10)
 HC 181
 HC 182
 HC 183
 HC 184
 HC 185
 HC 186
 HC 187
 HC 188
 HC 189
 HC 190 (ex -)
 HC 191 (ex-Autumn Leaf)
 HC 192
 HC 193
 HC 194
 HC 195
 HC 196
 HC 197
 HC 198
 HC 199
 HC 200
 HC 201 (ex-Yendys)
 HC 202 (ex-Mudathalapadu)
 HC 203
 HC 204
 HC 205
 HC 206
 HC 207 (ex-Paragon II I)
 HC 208
 HC 209
 HC 210
 HC 211
 HC 212
 HC 213
 HC 214
 HC 215
 HC 217
 HC 218 (ex-Retlas)
 HC 219
 HC 220
 HC 221
 HC 223 (ex-Sea Bird II)
 HC 224
 HC 225
 HC 230
 HC 231
 HC 232
 HC 233
 HC 234
 HC 235
 HC 236
 HC 237
 HC 238
 HC 239
 HC 240
 HC 241
 HC 242
 HC 243
 HC 244
 HC 245
 HC 246
 HC 247
 HC 248
 HC 249
 HC 250
 HC 251
 HC 252
 HC 253
 HC 254
 HC 255
 HC 256
 HC 257
 HC 258
 HC 259
 HC 260
 HC 261
 HC 262
 HC 263
 HC 264
 HC 265
 HC 266
 HC 267
 HC 268
 HC 269
 HC 270
 HC 272
 HC 273
 HC 274
 HC 275
 HC 276
 HC 277
 HC 278
 HC 279
 HC 280
 HC 281
 HC 282
 HC 284
 HC 285
 HC 286
 HC 287
 HC 288
 HC 289
 HC 290
 HC 291
 HC 292
 HC 293
 HC 294
 HC 295
 HC 296
 HC 297
 HC 298 (Weetiebud)
 HC 299
 HC 300 (ex-Lipari)
 HC 301
 HC 303
 HC 304
 HC 305
 HC 306
 HC 307
 HC 309
 HC 310
 HC 311
 HC 312
 HC 313
 HC 314
 HC 315
 HC 316
 HC 319
 HC 320
 HC 322 (Fy 47, Sea Wave) 
 HC 323
 HC 325
 HC 326
 HC 327
 HC 328 (Fy 41, ex-Bluenose) 
 HC 329
 HC 330
 HC 331
 HC 332
 HC 333
 HC 334
 HC 335
 HC 336
 HC 337
 HC 338
 HC 339 (Fy 45, ex-Sea Flash)
 HC 340 (ex-)
 HC 342
 HC 343
 HC 344
 HC 345 (ex-Go Getter)
 HC 346
 HC 347
 HC 349
 HC 350
 HC 351
 HPC 1
 HPC 2
 HPC 3
 HPC 4
 HPC 5
 HPC 6
 HPC 7
 HPC 8
 HPC 9
 HPC 10
 HPC 11
 HPC 12
 HPC 14
 HPC 15
 HPC 16
 HPC 17
 HPS 18 (Imperator Z18)
 HPC 19
 HPC 20
 HPC 21 (ex-Lucinda II)
 HPC 22 (ex-Kwabeeta)
 HPC 23
 HPC 24
 HPC 25
 HPC 26
 HPC 27
 HPC 28
 HPC 29
 HPC 30
 HPC 31
 HPC 33
 HPC 34
 HPC 35
 HPC 36
 HPC 37
 HPC 38
 HPC 39
 HPC 40
 HPC 41

Hospital ships

 (ex-HMS Letitia)

Mine laying vessels

  
  (M03/M53)

Minesweeper auxiliaries

 (TR 18/J06) 
HMCS Cape Beale (Fy 26) 
HMCS Joan W. II (Fy 34)
HMCS Mitchell Bay (Fy 05) 
 (J13/J11/Z11)
 (Z33/J08)
HMCS Signal (Fy 30) 
 (Z16/J00)  
HMCS Suderoy I
HMCS Suderoy II 
HMCS Suderoy IV (J03) 
HMCS Suderoy V (J04) 
HMCS Suderoy VI (J05) 
HMCS Takla (Fy 27) 
 (J11/Z21)
HMCS Vercheres

Mobile deperming craft

HMCS Gryme (Z60) 
 (Z09/J01/J09)

Patrol boats

HMCS Acadia
HMCS Adversus (J17) 
 (Z18/J18)
HMCS Allaverdy (Fy 06) 
HMCS Andamara (Z 22)
HMCS Anna Mildred (Fy 87/Z12A) 
 HMCS Bantie (W 04)
HMCS Barclay Sound (Fy23)  
HMCS Barmar (Fy 10/Z115)
 Bartlett
HMCS B.C. Lady (Fy 07, later to RCAF) 
HMCS Billow (Fy 25), ex-(Fy 32) 
HMCS Camenita (Fy 41)
HMCS Cancolim  (Z10)
HMCS Canfisco (Fy 17) 
HMCS Capella (Fy 31) 
HMCS Chamiss Bay (Fy 39/F50) 
HMCS Cleopatra (Fy 89/Z35) 
HMCS Combat (later to RCAF) 
HMCS Comber (Fy 37) (ex-C.S.C. II) 
HMCS Crest (Fy 38) (ex-May S) 
HMCS Dalehurst (Fy 35) (ex-Glendale V) 
HMCS Departure Bay (Fy 48) 
HMCS Earl Field (Fy 40)
HMCS Ehkoli (Fy 12)
HMCS Eileen
HMCS Fifer (Fy 00/Z30) 
HMCS Interceptor (Z15)
HMCS Howe Sound I (Fy 19) 
HMCS Johanna (Fy 28) 
HMCS Kuitan (Fy 14) 
HMCS Leola Vivien (Fy 15, also called Leelo) 
HMCS Lil II 
HMCS Louis Herbert (Fy 92/J22) 
HMCS Loyal I (Fy 43) 
HMCS Loyal II (Fy 22/Z25) (ex-Foam)
HMCS Maraudor (Fy 03) 
HMCS Margaret I (Fy 29) 
HMCS Meander (Z04) 
HMCS Merry Chase (Fy 46) 
HMCS Moolock (Fy 16) 
HMCS Moresby III (Fy 42) 
HMCS Nenamook (Fy 13) 
 (P12/Z12)
HMCS San Tomas (Fy 02) 
HMCS Santa Maria (Fy 08) 
HMCS Smith Sound (Fy 18) 
HMCS Snow Prince (later to RCAF)
HMCS Spray (Fy 33/Z09) (ex-'Hatta VII') 
HMCS Springtime V (Fy 09) 
HMCS Starling (II)
HMCS Surf (Fy 24) (ex-Arashio) 
HMCS Talapus (Fy 11) 
HMCS Tordo| (Fy 20) 
HMCS Valdes (Fy 21) 
HMCS Vanisle (Fy 01) 
 (Z21)
HMCS West Coast (Fy 04) 
HMCS Western Maid (Fy 36)

Survey vessels

Support ships

 (Z40) 
 (Z41) 
 (Z56) 
 (Z57) 

 (Z43/J43)
 (F94) 
 (F100)
 
 (Z42) 

HMCS Westore

Tenders

 HMCS Chief Seagay
 HMCS Chief Tapeet
 HMCS "Crusader"

Training vessels

 HMCS Attaboy
 HMCS Cairn
 HMCS Donnaconna II
 HMCS Milicette
 
 HMCS Pathfinder
 HMCS Scatari
 HMCS Shirl
 
 HMCS St. Clair
 HMCS Venetia  
  (later HC 190)

Tugboats 

 HMCS Glenada (W30) (Glen class)
 HMCS Glenbrook (W64/YTB 501) (Glen class)
 HMCS Glenclova (Glen class)
 HMCS Glencove (W37) (Glen class)
 HMCS Glendevon (W38/YTB 505) (Glen class)
 HMCS Glendon (W39/YTB 506) (Glen class)
 HMCS Glendower (W24) (Glen class)
 HMCS Glendyne (W68/YTM 503) (Glen class)
 HMCS Gleneagle (W40) (Glen class)
 HMCS Glenella (W41) (Glen class)
 HMCS Glen Evis (W65/YTB 502) (Glen class)
 HMCS Glenfield (W42) (Glen class)
 HMCS Glenholme (W28) (Glen class)
 HMCS Glenkeen (W67) (Glen class)
 HMCS Glen Lea (W25) (Glen class)
 HMCS Glenlivet (W43/YTB 504) (Glen class)
 HMCS Glenmont (W27) (Glen class)
 HMCS Glenora (W26) (Glen class)
 HMCS Glenside (W63/YTB 500) (Glen class)
 HMCS Glenvalley (W44) (Glen class)
 HMCS Glenwood (W45) (Glen class)
 HMCS Alberton (W48) (Norton class)
 HMCS Beaverton (W23) (Norton class)
 HMCS Birchton (W35) (Norton class)
 HMCS Clifton (W36/ATA 529) (Norton class)
 HMCS Heatherton (W22/ATA 527) (Norton class)
 HMCS Maxwellton (W46) (Norton class)
 HMCS Norton (W31) (Norton class)
 HMCS Riverton (W47/ATA 528) (Norton class)
 Adamsville (YTS 582)  (Ville class)
 Auburnville (W50) (Ville class)
 Barkerville (Ville class)
 Beamsville (YTS 583) (Ville class)
 Blissville (W56) (Ville class)
 Bonnyville (Ville class)
 Coalville (YTS 576) (Ville class)
 Eckville (W58/YTS 580) (Ville class)
 Grenville (W20) (Ville class)
 HMCS Haysville (W18) (Ville class)
 Hartville (Ville class)
 Hodgeville (W53) (Ville class)
 Innisville (Ville class)
 Jamesville (Ville class)
 Johnville (Ville class)
 Kayville (Ville class)
 Kingsville (W19) (Ville class)
 Lakeville (W21) (Ville class)
 Lawrenceville (YTS 584) (Ville class)
 Listerville (YTS 578)  (Ville class)
 Loganville (YTS 589) (Ville class)
 Luceville (Ville class)
 Mannville (W57/YTS 577)  (Ville class)
 Martinville (W61) (Ville class)
 Marysville (YTS 585) (Ville class)
 Merrickville (Ville class)
 Neville (Ville class)
 Otterville (W32/YTS 590) (Ville class)
 Parksville (W49/YTS 579) (Ville class)
 Pierreville (Ville class)
 HMCS Plainsville (W01/YTS 587) (Ville class)
 Queensville (YTS 586) (Ville class)
 Radville (W52) (Ville class)
 Roseville (Ville class)
 Streetsville (W55) (Ville class)
 Shawville (Ville class)
 Youville (YTS 588) (Ville class)
 FT 1 (Fire tug)
 FT 2 (Fire tug)
 FT 3 (Fire tug)
 HMCS Bally (Fy 88) 
 HMCS Bersimis 
 Brighton (W35)
 HMCS D.W. Murray
 HMCS J.A.Cornett
 HMCS Frank Dixon
 HMCS Haro
 HMCS Helena
 HMCS Helen S
 HMCS Lisgar
 HMCS North Lake
 HMCS North Shore
 HMCS North Star 
 HMCS Northwind
 HMCS Ocean Eagle (Fy 71/J07) 
 HMCS Patricia McQueen
 HMCS Pugwash (W01)
HMCS Ripple II (Fy)
 HMCS Stanpoint

W/T Calibration vessels

HMCS Aristocrat (Z46)
HMCS Seretha II (Fy 45/Z45)

Other

HMCS Kipawo (BMV)
 (Z17/J10) (CS Tow)
HMCS Anashene
HMCS Andrew Lee
HMCS Andy (II)

 (ex-HMCS Charny)
HMCS Lady Rodney (Fy 46/F40) 
 (P07/Z07)
HMCS Madawaska
HMCS Magedoma
 (P03/Z03) 
 
 (Fy 32)

 (J12)

Depot ships
Depot ships, also known as stone frigates or accommodation ships, are those navy shore establishments that are by tradition allocated ship names. In some instances the name for an establishment located at a harbour is derived from an actual ship stationed permanently in that harbour.

See also
 Royal Canadian Navy
 Origins of the Royal Canadian Navy
 History of the Royal Canadian Navy
 List of ships of the Royal Canadian Navy
 Hull classification symbol (Canada)
 Her Majesty's Canadian Ship
 List of aircraft of the Royal Canadian Navy
List of Royal Canadian Navy ships of the First World War
List of Royal Canadian Navy ships of the Cold War

References

Bibliography and further reading

 
 
 
 
 
 
 
 
 
 
 
 
 

 

Canadian Forces Maritime Command
World War II
Military equipment of Canada
World War II
World War II
 
Navy
Can
Navy
Navy